Mohammad Ab Aziz bin Ismail (born 7 August 1988) is a Malaysian professional footballer who plays as a left back.

Club career

Kelantan FA
In November 2010, Aziz completed his transfer to Kelantan from Kuala Lumpur-based club, KL Plus. Aziz has helped KL Plus qualifying for the quarter-finals of the Malaysia Cup in 2009 and runners-up of 2007–08 Malaysia Premier League season. In the middle of the 2012 league season, Aziz has got ACL injury in his left leg. After recovering from the injury, he made into friendly match for the preparation of the new season. But after only a few minutes he was on the field, the same injury struck his right leg. The injury has left him unable to play during the 2013 season. On 16 November 2013, Aziz extended his contract for two years with Kelantan. On 22 November 2014, he was released from the team and signed one-year contract with Pahang FA.

Pahang FA
On November 2014, after he was released from Kelantan FA, Aziz signed one-year contract with Pahang FA.

Melaka United
On 5 January 2016, Aziz signed one-year contract with Malaysia Premier League club, Melaka United.

Return to Kelantan FA
In December 2016, despite the turmoil of withdrawal Kelantan FA from the 2017 Malaysia Super League, Aziz Ismail returned to Kelantan after helping Melaka United win the Premier League in 2016. Before playing for Melaka United, Aziz played for Pahang FA for one season in 2015. His history with Kelantan began in 2011 when he brought home from KL Plus FC. Kelantan coach at the time, Datuk M. Karathu began to trust him to undertake the task of strengthening the defense left in rotation with Zairul Fitree Ishak.

On 4 March 2017, Aziz made his 2017 season league debut coming from the bench substitute for Mohammed Ghaddar at 90th minutes in away match against Perak in Perak Stadium. Kelantan won that match by 4–2.

Injury
Aziz went through knee surgery in January 2013 and is set to miss half a year of action. He unable to play for a year due for injury he picked up during a friendly match against Kedah FA. This is another setback for Aziz, who had to miss the whole season last year, after his left knee gave way early in the season. This time, it is his right knee and he has to undergo surgery on 2 January 2013 to get it fixed. He can probably play next season is during the Malaysia Cup, as the doctor expects him to be out for six or seven months.

Honour

Kelantan
 Liga Super: 2012, 2011
 Piala Malaysia: 2012
 Piala FA: 2012; Runner Up 2011
 Piala Sumbangsih: 2011;Runner-up 2012, 2013

Melaka United
 Liga Premier: 2016

KL Plus
 Liga Premier; Runner-up 2007-08

Career statistics

Club

References

External links
 Profile at theredwarriorsfc.com
 Aziz Ismail at SoccerPunter.com
 

1988 births
Living people
Malaysian footballers
Kelantan FA players
People from Kelantan
Melaka United F.C. players
Malaysian people of Malay descent
Association football fullbacks